Robyn Maynard is a Black Canadian writer. She is most noted for her 2017 book Policing Black Lives: State Violence in Canada from Slavery to the Present, an examination of anti-Black Canadian racism that explores the enduring legacy of slavery in the ways that Black people experience surveillance and captivity through policing, jails, prisons, child welfare, and border controls. The book was designated as one of the “best 100 books of 2017” by the Hill Times, listed in The Walrus‘s “best books of 2018”, shortlisted for an Atlantic Book Award, the Concordia University First Book Prize and the Mavis Gallant Prize for Non-fiction. It is the winner of the 2017 Annual Errol Morris Book Prize. Its French translation won the Prix des Libraires du Québec (2019) in the essay category.

Robyn Maynard's recent scholarly publications include "Police Abolition/Black Revolt"  and "Black Life and Death Across the US-Canada Border: Border violence, Black fugitive belonging and a Turtle Island view of Black liberation."

Her writing has also appeared in publications including the Washington Post, the World Policy Journal, the Toronto Star, Canadian Woman Studies, Scholar and Feminist Online, and Maisonneuve.

In 2020 she was shortlisted for the Dayne Ogilvie Prize, Canada's literary award for emerging LGBTQ writers.

Her newest work is called Rehearsals for Living, a book co-authored with Leanne Betasamosake Simpson. Rehearsals for Living is an exchange between two activists, one Black, and one Indigenous; both women and mothers, on the subject of where we go from here. The book is a national bestseller and was shortlisted for a 2022 Governor General's Award for non-Fiction. literature

References

External links

21st-century Canadian non-fiction writers
21st-century Canadian women writers
Activists from Toronto
Canadian women non-fiction writers
Black Canadian women
Black Canadian writers
Black Canadian LGBT people
Black Canadian activists
Canadian LGBT writers
Writers from Toronto
Living people
Year of birth missing (living people)
21st-century Canadian LGBT people